Gregory V (born , Georgios Angelopoulos; 1746) was Ecumenical Patriarch of Constantinople from 1797 to 1798, from 1806 to 1808, and from 1818 to 1821. He was responsible for much restoration work to the Patriarchal Cathedral of St George, which had been badly damaged by fire in 1738.

Biography
Born in Dimitsana, he studied in Athens for two years beginning in 1756, then moved to Smyrna for five more years of study. Tonsured as a monk with the name "Gregory" at the monastery in Strofades, he then studied at Patmiada School. Returning to Smyrna, he was ordained to the diaconate by Procopius who was Metropolitan of Smyrna at the time. In 1785, Gregory was consecrated as Metropolitan of Smyrna when Procopius was elected as Ecumenical Patriarch of Constantinople. In 1797, Gregory was first elected Ecumenical Patriarch upon the resignation of Gerasimus III.

At the onset of the Greek War of Independence, as Ethnarch of the Orthodox Millet Gregory V was blamed by Ottoman Sultan Mahmud II for his inability to suppress the Greek uprising. This was in spite of the fact that Gregory had condemned the Greek revolutionary activities in order to protect the Greeks of Constantinople from such reprisals by the Ottoman Turks. After the Greek rebels scored several successes against the Ottoman forces in the Peloponnese, these reprisals came. 

He was then lynched, his corpse being left for two days on the main gate of the Patriarchate compound, all by order of the Sultan. 
The Patriarch's body was eventually interred in the Metropolitan Cathedral of Athens. He is commemorated by the Greek Orthodox Church as an Ethnomartyr. In his memory, the Saint Peter Gate, once the main gate of the Patriarchate compound, was welded shut in 1821 and has remained shut ever since.

Influence
The brutal murder of Gregory V, especially on the day of Pascha, shocked and infuriated the Greeks, and Orthodox Russia. It also caused protests in the rest of Europe and reinforced the movement of Philhellenism. There are references that during the Greek War of Independence, many revolutionaries engraved on their swords the name of Gregory, seeking revenge.

Dionysios Solomos, in his "Hymn to Liberty", which later became the Greek national anthem, also mentions the hanging of the patriarch in some stanzas.

Jewish-Greek animosity

According to several accounts, after Gregory's death, his body, along with those of other executed prelates, was turned over to the city's Jews, who dragged it through the streets and threw it into the sea. This led to several bloody reprisal attacks in southern Greece by the Greek rebels, who regarded the Jews as collaborators of the Turks. This in turn led to the Jews joining the Turks in attacks on Christians in some locations in northern Greece, which fueled a new wave of anti-Jewish attacks in the south. During the night, the patriarch's corpse was recovered by Greek sailors, who brought it to Odessa. After the funeral, some Greek sailors attacked Jewish shops which had remained open during the ceremony.

In Odessa, then part of the Russian Empire, local Greeks committed what some sources consider the first Russian pogrom killing 14 Jews on the basis that Jews had taken part in Gregory's lynching.

Gallery

References

1746 births
1821 deaths
18th-century Ecumenical Patriarchs of Constantinople
19th-century Christian martyrs
19th-century Ecumenical Patriarchs of Constantinople
19th-century executions by the Ottoman Empire
Christian saints killed by Muslims
Eastern Orthodox bishops of Smyrna
Executed Greek people
Greek saints of the Eastern Orthodox Church
People executed by the Ottoman Empire by hanging
People from Dimitsana
Persecution of Christians in the Ottoman Empire
Persecution of Eastern Orthodox Christians
Saints of Ottoman Greece